Chiradip "Chiro" Mukerjea (born 14 August 1953) is an Indian former professional tennis player.

Biography
Born in Calcutta, Mukerjea played on the professional tour in the 1970s. He was unbeaten during his Davis Cup career for India, winning three singles and one doubles rubber.

His first Davis Cup appearance came in India's 4–0 win over Pakistan in 1973, where he played a dead rubber reverse singles against Saeed Meer which was abandoned after one set. He next played in 1976, featuring in ties against Thailand and the Philippines. In the tie against Thailand he was again called up for a dead rubber reverse singles and beat Somparn Champisri in straight sets. He was used more in the subsequent tie against the Philippines and won both of his singles rubbers in five sets, as well as the doubles rubber, with Sashi Menon.

Mukerjea reached the second round in both of his Wimbledon singles main draw appearances, which included a win over Wojciech Fibak in 1975. He was a doubles finalist at the 1976 Indian Open and won a doubles bronze medal at the 1978 Asian Games in Bangkok.

Grand Prix career finals

Doubles: 1 (0–1)

See also
List of India Davis Cup team representatives

References

External links
 
 
 
 

1953 births
Living people
Indian male tennis players
Tennis players from Kolkata
Asian Games medalists in tennis
Asian Games bronze medalists for India
Medalists at the 1978 Asian Games
Tennis players at the 1978 Asian Games